Danefield House, Largs, North Ayrshire, Scotland, is a late 19th-century villa designed for William Crum by John Douglas. Douglas's only house in Scotland, it is a Category B listed building.

History and description
The house is dated 1883 and was designed by John Douglas for W. G. Crum. The Crums were connected by marriage with Larg's most notable resident, William Thomson, 1st Baron Kelvin, who had built a large mansion, Netherhall, in the town. They also rented Mere Old Hall in Cheshire, the county in which Douglas was most prolific.

Pevsner describes the style of Danefield as "a simplified version of (Douglas's) Arts and Crafts Paddocks (with a) dash of Scots Baronial". Of two storeys, with substantial cellars and attics, the villa is constructed of yellow ashlar with old red sandstone dressings. It is a Category B listed building.

References

Sources

See also
List of houses and associated buildings by John Douglas

Houses completed in 1883
Buildings and structures in North Ayrshire
History of North Ayrshire
Category B listed buildings in North Ayrshire
John Douglas buildings